Yueyue, Yue Yue, Yüyue, Yueyü, Yüyü, or variant may refer to:
 Deng Senyue, nicknamed Yueyue, Chinese rhythmic gymnast
 Shen Yueyue (沈跃跃), Chinese politician
 Little Yueyue, Chinese internet celebrity
 Xia Gui (1195–1224), also known as Yüyü, Chinese landscape painter
 Yue Yue (王悦, Wang Yue), Chinese girl killed in a traffic incident
 Yû Yû, Japanese animanga

See also 
 Yuyu (disambiguation)
 Yuyue (disambiguation)
 Yueyu, the Chinese dialect family including Cantonese